The 1967–68 Tercera División season is the 34th since its establishment.

Group 1

Group 2

Group 3

Group 4

Group 5

Group 6

Group 7

Group 8

Group 9

Group 10

Group 11

Group 12

Group 13

Group 14

Playoffs

Promotion to Segunda División (champions)

First round

  

Match of Tiebreaker:

 
 Indauchu received a bye.

Second round

Promotion/relegation Segunda División

First round

Match of Tiebreaker:

 Calella received a bye.

Second round

Match of Tiebreaker:

Final Round

 

Match of Tiebreaker:

External links
RSSSF 
Futbolme 

Tercera División seasons
3
Spain